Omorgus senegalensis is a species of hide beetle in the subfamily Omorginae and subgenus Afromorgus.

References

senegalensis
Beetles described in 1983